Alfred William Paul Bell (12 April 1914 – 4 July 1945) was an Australian rules footballer who played with St Kilda in the Victorian Football League. He returned to Shepparton in 1938, and coached his home team. He was killed in action in World War II.

Family
The son of John Thomas Bell (1880–1943), and Ada Barbara Bell (1878–1938), née Wilson, Alfred William Paul Bell was born at Shepparton on 12 April 1914. He married Beatrice "Rannie" Alcorn (1915–) on 16 September 1937. They had two daughters, Beverley, and Judith.

Education
He attended Shepparton High School; as did Beatrice Alcorn.

Football
Bell initially played with the Lemnos Football Club in the Goulburn Valley Second Eighteens Football Association (GVSEFA) in 1933 and then won the 1934 – GVSEFA Best & Fairest award / N. Gribble Cup. Bell then moved across to play in the stronger Goulburn Valley Football League with the Shepparton Football Club in 1935.

Having tried out with Richmond two years earlier,  he was cleared from Shepparton to St Kilda in June 1937. He travelled to and from Shepparton, rather than living in Melbourne, and he played 15 senior games with St Kilda over two seasons (1937 and 1938).

Military service
He served in the Second AIF as a commando. He was killed in action at Balikpapan, Borneo on 4 July 1945.

See also
 List of Victorian Football League players who died in active service

Footnotes

References
 Roll of Honour: Lance Corporal Alfred William Paul Bell (VX79445), Australian War Memorial.
 World War Two Nominal Roll: Lance Corporal Alfred William Paul Bell (VX79445).
 World War Two Service Record: Lance Corporal Alfred William Paul Bell (VX79445), National Archives of Australia.
 Football Pin-Up No.12: Paul Bell, The Shepparton Advertiser, (Friday, 5 July 1946), p.15.
 Grant, A., "Lest We Forget — Part 2", saints.com.au, 19 April 2007.
 RSL Virtual War Memorial: Alfred William Paul (Champ) Bell.
 Holmesby, Russell & Main, Jim (2007). The Encyclopedia of AFL Footballers. 7th ed. Melbourne: Bas Publishing.

External links

 Paul Bell, australianfootball.com.
 Boyles Football Photos: Paul Bell.

1914 births
1945 deaths
Australian rules footballers from Victoria (Australia)
St Kilda Football Club players
Shepparton Football Club players
Australian military personnel killed in World War II
Australian Army personnel of World War II
Burials at Labuan War Cemetery
Australian Army soldiers